My Brother from Senegal (French: Mon frangin du Sénégal) is a 1953 French comedy film directed by Guy Lacourt and starring Raymond Bussières, Annette Poivre and Noël Roquevert.

The film's sets were designed by the art director Paul-Louis Boutié.

Synopsis
A young photographer is in love with the daughter of a nearby grocer. However she is obsessed with the adventurous heroes she watches in films. To impress her he decides to invent an identical twin recently returned from French Africa.

Cast 
 Raymond Bussières as Jules Pinson, photograph and son "double": César
 Annette Poivre as Annette Bridoux, the daughter of the grocer
 Noël Roquevert as Mr Bridoux, the grocer and father of Annette
 Paulette Dubost as Séraphine, the maidservant of Mr Chaffinch
 Paul Demange as the ancient colonial
 Marcelle Arnold as Mrs Angèle
 Sophie Sel as Mrs Sophie, the florist
 Jacques Fabbri as the corporal of police station
 Gisèle Grandpré as the lady who makes photograph her binoculars
 Irène Bréor as the singer in the ball
 Albert Michel as the state trooper of the circulation
 Lud Germain as the hired black as clerk
 Louis Viret as the mister who puts down posters
 Eugène Stuber as an inhabitant beater
 Franck Maurice as an inhabitant beater
 Martine Beauvais as the lady to the small dog
 Louis de Funès as the doctor

References

Bibliography
 Ginette Vincendeau. Stars and Stardom in French Cinema. Bloomsbury Publishing, 2000.

External links 
 
 Mon frangin du Sénégal (1953) at the Films de France

1953 films
French comedy films
1950s French-language films
French black-and-white films
1953 comedy films
Films scored by Norbert Glanzberg
1950s French films

ru:Тайна Элен Маримон